Olfactory fatigue, also known as odor fatigue, olfactory adaptation, and noseblindness, is the temporary, normal inability to distinguish a particular odor after a prolonged exposure to that airborne compound. For example, when entering a restaurant initially the odor of food is often perceived as being very strong, but after time the awareness of the odor normally fades to the point where the smell is not perceptible or is much weaker.  After leaving the area of high odor, the sensitivity is restored with time. Anosmia is the permanent loss of the sense of smell, and is different from olfactory fatigue.

It is a term commonly used in wine tasting, where one loses the ability to smell and distinguish wine bouquet after sniffing at wine(s) continuously for an extended period of time. The term is also used in the study of indoor air quality, for example, in the perception of odors from people, tobacco, and cleaning agents. Since odor detection may be an indicator that exposure to certain chemicals is occurring, olfactory fatigue can also reduce one's awareness about chemical hazard exposure.

Olfactory fatigue is an example of neural adaptation. The body becomes desensitized to stimuli to prevent the overloading of the nervous system, thus allowing it to respond to new stimuli that are 'out of the ordinary'.

Mechanism

After olfactory neurons depolarize in response to an odorant, the G-protein mediated second messenger response activates adenylyl cyclase, increasing cyclic AMP (cAMP) concentration inside a cell, which then opens a cyclic nucleotide gated cation channel. The influx of Ca2+ ions through this channel triggers olfactory adaptation immediately because Ca2+/calmodulin-dependent protein kinase II or CaMK activation directly represses the opening of cation channels, inactivates adenylyl cyclase, and activates the phosphodiesterase that cleaves cAMP. This series of actions by CaMK desensitizes olfactory receptors to prolonged odorant exposure.

An ORN or an Olfactory Receptor Neuron alert goes off to detect the smell. When the nose is covered taste is a lot harder because the air we breathe goes into the mouth as well. A common idea is that vanilla smells sweet and that is because we taste sweet when we eat vanilla flavorings.

Mitigating scent effects on olfactory fatigue
According to a study by Grosofsky, Haupert and Versteeg, "fragrance sellers often provide coffee beans to their customers as a nasal palate cleanser" to reduce the effects of olfactory adaptation and habituation. In their study, participants sniffed coffee beans, lemon slices, or plain air. Participants then indicated which of four presented fragrances had not been previously smelled. The results indicated that coffee beans did not yield better performance than lemon slices or air.

See also 
 Adaptive system
 Anosmia
 Banner blindness
 Building Indoor Environment
 Olfaction
 Palate cleanser
 Phantosmia
 Semantic satiation
 Thermal comfort

References

External links 
 

Building biology
Olfaction
Wine tasting